Max J. Rosenberg (September 13, 1914 – June 14, 2004) was an American film producer, whose career spanned six decades. He was particularly known for his horror or supernatural films, and found much of his success while working in England.

Life and career
Rosenberg was born in The Bronx, New York City, to a family of Jewish immigrants. In 1945, he entered the film business by becoming a foreign film distributor. Although he primarily produced horror or supernatural films, his first film—Rock, Rock, Rock (1956)—was a musical. His partner in the production of this film was Milton Subotsky, with whom he founded the British company Amicus Productions in 1962.

Over the course of his career, Rosenberg produced more than 50 films, although his work was not always credited.  Among the other horror and supernatural films he produced were such titles as Tales from the Crypt (1972), The Land That Time Forgot (1974), and its sequel, The People That Time Forgot (1977).

Rosenberg also produced a children's film, Lad, a Dog (1962), director Richard Lester's first film, It's Trad, Dad! (1962), and two films based on the Doctor Who British science-fiction television series: Dr. Who and the Daleks (1965) and Daleks' Invasion Earth 2150 A.D. (1966). He was particularly proud to have produced the 1968 film of Harold Pinter's The Birthday Party, starring Robert Shaw and directed by William Friedkin. Rosenberg continued to work well into his 80s; his final film credit was 1997's Perdita Durango (a.k.a. Dance with the Devil).

Rosenberg died in Los Angeles, California in 2004, at the age of 89.

Selected credits
Rock, Rock, Rock (1956)
City of the Dead (1960)
The Last Mile (1960)
Girl of the Night (1960)
Lad, A Dog (1961)
It's Trad, Dad! (1962)
Just for Fun (1963)

References

External links
 
 
 Memorial
 Obituary in The Times
 Obituary at americancinematheque.com
 Obituary at bmonster.com

1914 births
2004 deaths
20th-century American businesspeople
American company founders
American expatriates in the United Kingdom
Film producers from New York (state)
20th-century American Jews
Businesspeople from New York City
People from the Bronx
21st-century American Jews